"Tell Your Friends"  is a song by Canadian singer the Weeknd, from his second studio album Beauty Behind the Madness (2015). The Weeknd co-wrote the song with Kanye West, Christopher Pope, Carlo Montagnese, Carl Marshall and Robert Holmes, and co-produced it with Pope, West, Omar Riad, Illangelo, Mike Dean and Noah Goldstein. The track samples the song "Can't Stop Loving You" by Soul Dog. A live remix of the song with American rapper Nas was performed at the 2016 Met Gala Ball.

Music video
The music video for "Tell Your Friends", directed by Grant Singer, was released on August 24, 2015. The music video also features another track from Beauty Behind the Madness, "Real Life" which is played at the end of the video while the Weeknd is driving out into the night. As of October 2021, the video has surpassed over 70 million views. 

Synopsis

The video begins with the Weeknd walking into foreground holding a shovel. He appears to be burying himself. We then see the Weeknd successfully bury himself. He sticks the shovel in the sand and starts to walk away from where he is buried while performing to the song. A weird looking skinny man approaches his direction before getting shot by the Weeknd. The Weeknd gets closer standing over him, looks down at the body and shoots him again. Another song “Real Life” plays at the end of the video as he walks back to where his car is parked. The Weeknd then gets into the car and starts driving out into the night.

Charts

Weekly charts

Year-end charts

Certifications

"When I See It"

The original version of the song, titled "When I See It", was released by Kanye West to SoundCloud on October 19, 2015, alongside a remix of his 808s & Heartbreak (2008) track "Say You Will" featuring Caroline Shaw.

References

2015 songs
The Weeknd songs
Contemporary R&B ballads
Song recordings produced by Illangelo
Song recordings produced by Kanye West
Song recordings produced by the Weeknd
Songs written by Illangelo
Songs written by Kanye West
Songs written by the Weeknd
Songs about Canada
2010s ballads